Downfield may refer to:

 Downfield, Dundee, an area of Dundee, Scotland
 Downfield F.C., a Scottish junior football club based in the Downfield area of Dundee